Antony William Allen (22 December 1912 – 21 December 2003) was an English first-class cricketer.

Allen was educated at Eton and Magdalene College, Cambridge. A right-handed batsman, he played 35 matches for Cambridge University from 1932 to 1934, Northamptonshire County Cricket Club from 1932 to 1936, Marylebone Cricket Club in 1934 and the Free Foresters in 1946 and 1947. He scored 4 first-class centuries, with a highest innings of 144 against Sussex. He also scored 142 against Glamorgan.

References

1912 births
2003 deaths
English cricketers
Northamptonshire cricketers
Free Foresters cricketers
Cambridge University cricketers
Marylebone Cricket Club cricketers
People educated at Eton College
Alumni of Magdalene College, Cambridge
People from West Northamptonshire District